Stadion am Gesundbrunnen was a multi-use stadium in the Gesundbrunnen locality of Berlin, Germany. It was initially used as the stadium of Hertha BSC matches.  During the 1936 Summer Olympics, it hosted some of the football matches. It was replaced by the current Olympic Stadium when Hertha joined the Bundesliga in 1963. In 1974, Hertha sold the ground to avoid bankruptcy.  The capacity of the “Plumpe” stadium was 35,239 spectators.

References
1936 Summer Olympics official report. Volume 2. pp. 1047-56.
 www.hertha-geschichte.de
 www.die-fans.de
 www.schoelkopf.com

Venues of the 1936 Summer Olympics
Olympic football venues
Hertha BSC
Defunct football venues in Germany
Defunct sports venues in Germany
Sports venues in Berlin
Football venues in Berlin